Triorbis is a genus of moths of the family Nolidae. The genus was erected by George Hampson in 1894.

Species
 Triorbis annulata (Swinhoe, 1890)
 Triorbis aureovitta Hampson, 1902

References

Nolidae